Marguerite Laugier (née Lhomme) (12 September 1896 – 10 June 1976) was a French astronomer active at the Nice Observatory from the 1930s to the 1950s. Contemporary astronomical articles refer to her as "Madame Laugier".

The Minor Planet Center credits her with the discovery of 21 numbered asteroids, made between 1932 and 1955.

In 1939, she was awarded the Lalande Prize for her work.

The outer main-belt asteroid 1597 Laugier, discovered by Louis Boyer at Algiers in 1949, is named in her honor.

Note: She is not to be confused with a male "M. Laugier" in 19th century literature, where the M. stands for "Monsieur". This refers to Paul Auguste Ernest Laugier (1812–1872).

References 
 

 Brüggenthies, Wilhelm; Dick, Wolfgang R.: Biographischer Index der Astronomie / Biographical Index of Astronomy. Frankfurt a. M. 2005, 

20th-century French astronomers

1896 births
1976 deaths
Discoverers of asteroids
Women astronomers
20th-century French women scientists
Recipients of the Lalande Prize